
Year 874 (DCCCLXXIV) was a common year starting on Friday (link will display the full calendar) of the Julian calendar.

Events 
 By place 

 Europe 

 Salomon, duke ('king') of Brittany, is murdered by a faction which includes his son-in-law Pascweten and Gurvand, son-in-law of late ruler Erispoe. After Salomon's death they divide the country, and Pascweten and Gurvand co-rule Brittany.
 Svatopluk I, ruler (knyaz) of Great Moravia, concludes a peace treaty at Forchheim (Northern Bavaria). He is able to expand his territories outside the Frankish sphere, and subjugates the Vistulans.Kirschbaum 2007, p. 121.
 Ingólfr Arnarson arrives from Norway, as the first permanent Viking settler in Iceland. He builds his homestead and founds Reykjavík. The settlement of Iceland begins (approximate date).

 Britain 

 The Danish Vikings (from their base at Repton) drive King Burgred of Mercia into exile, and sack Tamworth. They conquer his kingdom and install his political opponent, Ceolwulf II, as sub-king.
 Autumn – The Great Heathen Army splits into two bands; Halfdan returns with his forces to Northumbria, along with his brother Ubba, where he establishes a new base on the River Tyne. 
 Amlaíb Conung, the first Norse 'king' of Dublin, is killed in Scotland, during a campaign against his rival Constantin I (approximate date).
 November – Frost begins in Scotland, and lasts until April 875.

 China 

 Huang Chao, a salt privateer, joins forces with Wang Xianzhi to raise a rebel army at Changyuan (modern Xinxiang). The uprising further weakens the Tang dynasty, which is already weakened by natural disasters such as severe droughts and floods.

 By topic 

 Religion 
 March 13 – The remains of Saint Nikephorus I are interred in the Church of the Holy Apostles, in Constantinople.
 The monastery of Sevanavank, located on the shore of Lake Sevan (Armenia), is founded.

Births 
 May 10 – Meng Zhixiang, general of Later Tang (d. 934)
 Abu al-Hasan al-Ash'ari, Muslim scholar (d. 936)
 Edward the Elder, king of Wessex (approximate date)
 Constantine II, king of Scotland (approximate date)
 Liu Yin, governor (jiedushi) of Southern Han (d. 911)
 Lothar II, Frankish nobleman (d. 929)
 Ota, Frankish queen and Holy Roman Empress (approximate date)
 Wang Shifan, Chinese warlord (d. 908)

Deaths 
 January 4 – Hasan al-Askari, 11th Shia Imam (b. 846)
 August 15 – Altfrid, bishop of Hildesheim
 December 16 – Ado, archbishop of Vienne 
 Amlaíb Conung, Viking leader (approximate date)
 Bayazid Bastami, Persian Sufi (approximate date)
 Han Yunzhong, general of the Tang dynasty (b. 814)
 Liu Zhan, chancellor of the Tang Dynasty
 Lu Yan, chancellor of the Tang Dynasty (b. 829)
 Pei Tan, chancellor of the Tang Dynasty
 Salomon, duke ('king') of Brittany
 Unruoch III, margrave of Friuli

References